Chevitipalle Bellum Moses Frederick was the third Bishop in Rayalaseema of the Church of South India.

Further reading
 
Notes

 

Anglican bishops of Rayalaseema
20th-century Anglican bishops in India
21st-century Anglican bishops in India
Senate of Serampore College (University) alumni
Church of South India clergy
Indian bishops
Indian Christian religious leaders